Adam Tindall-Schlicht is an American government official, who is currently serving as the eleventh Administrator of the Great Lakes St. Lawrence Seaway Development Corporation. President Joe Biden appointed Tindall-Schlicht to the role of GLS Administrator on November 6, 2022. 

Prior to his presidential appointment, he was appointed in August 2018 as director of the Port of Milwaukee, replacing former director Paul Vornholt and served in that role until October 2022.

President Joe Biden appointed Adam Tindall-Schlicht to the role of GLS administrator on November 6, 2022.

References

People from Milwaukee
American University alumni
University of Wisconsin–Madison alumni
Year of birth missing (living people)
Living people
Biden administration personnel